Burkeville is a town in Nottoway County, Virginia, United States. The population was 432 at the 2010 census.  The source of the town name is disputed. The town is located on the crossroads of U.S. Routes 360 and 460.

Businesses in the small town of Burkeville include a stone quarry, a Southern States Cooperative store, and a John Deere dealership. Bassett Furniture operated a veneer factory in Burkeville for many years but it has closed. The Nottoway Correctional Center is located in Burkeville as is the Piedmont Geriatric Hospital. There is also a camp retreat for the blind.

History 

The town was named either for a tavern or a Samuel Burke. It was formerly "Burke's Junction." It formed at the junction of the Richmond and Danville Railroad and the Southside Railroad in the mid-nineteenth century.  The Southside became the Atlantic, Mississippi and Ohio Railroad in 1870 and then a line in the Norfolk and Western Railway and the Norfolk Southern Railway.  The rail line from Burkville to Pamplin City was converted by Virginia Department of Parks and Recreation into High Bridge Trail State Park.

The last Civil War battle before the surrender at Appomattox was fought nearby at Sayler's Creek on April 6, 1865. Here were surrendered more men (without terms) than in any other battle on American soil. General Robert E. Lee's depleted forces lost over 7,000 men killed, wounded, or taken prisoner at either Sayler's Creek or at General Gordon's engagement the same day, a few miles west. This led Lee to surrender at Appomattox three days later.

Ella Grahamn Agnew, in 1910 in Burkeville, was appointed the first State Agent for women by the United States Department of Agriculture and was the first woman to be appointed by the Department to represent it in the field. She had moved to the town as a baby and was later buried in the community's Sunset Cemetery.

Polk Miller, renowned old time banjo-player, story-teller, veterinarian, and Confederate veteran, was born on a plantation just west of Burkeville in 1844.  Though he moved to Richmond shortly before the Civil War, he paid homage to his Southside roots through his music and story-telling, in which he engaged himself professionally in the late 19th and early 20th centuries, sharing a stage on occasion with Mark Twain, and becoming the first known artist to record music with a mixed-race ensemble.

Burke's Tavern, Hyde Park, and Inverness are listed on the National Register of Historic Places.

Geography
Burkeville is located at  (37.187131, -78.201702).

According to the United States Census Bureau, the town has a total area of 1.0 square miles (2.6 km2), of which, 1.0 square miles (2.6 km2) of it is land and 0.99% is water.

Twin Lakes State Park (formerly Prince Edward-Goodwin Lake State Park) is to the west of town.

Demographics

As of the census of 2000, there were 489 people, 206 households, and 134 families residing in the town. The population density was 486.3 people per square mile (186.9/km2). There were 248 housing units at an average density of 246.6 per square mile (94.8/km2). The racial makeup of the town was 62.78% White, 34.76% African American, 1.02% from other races, and 1.43% from two or more races. Hispanic or Latino of any race were 1.43% of the population.

There were 206 households, out of which 27.7% had children under the age of 18 living with them, 43.7% were married couples living together, 18.4% had a female householder with no husband present, and 34.5% were non-families. 30.6% of all households were made up of individuals, and 16.0% had someone living alone who was 65 years of age or older. The average household size was 2.37 and the average family size was 2.95.

In the town, the population was spread out, with 23.3% under the age of 18, 8.8% from 18 to 24, 25.2% from 25 to 44, 24.1% from 45 to 64, and 18.6% who were 65 years of age or older. The median age was 40 years. For every 100 females there were 91.8 males. For every 100 females age 18 and over, there were 90.4 males.

The median income for a household in the town was $29,821, and the median income for a family was $39,688. Males had a median income of $23,542 versus $21,442 for females. The per capita income for the town was $15,947. About 7.8% of families and 12.3% of the population were below the poverty line, including 16.1% of those under age 18 and 8.7% of those age 65 or over.

References

Towns in Nottoway County, Virginia
Towns in Virginia